Con Tanto Amor is the fifteenth studio album by La Mafia.  It was released on December 1, 1990. The album entered at number twenty-four on the billboard charts and reached number five by 1991. On September 15, 2017 a re-mastered version of the album was released in digital form.

Track listing

References

1990 albums
La Mafia albums
Spanish-language albums